The EliteForsk Prize (Elite Research Prize) is the most prestigious award given by the Danish Council for Independent Research, of the Danish Ministry of Higher Education and Science. The award of 1.2 million Danish krone honors outstanding researchers of international acclaim, who are under 45 years of age, and is currently awarded to five individuals annually.

Recipients

External links 
 Danish Council for Independent Research
 EliteForsk

References 

Danish awards